The fifteenth season of RuPaul's Drag Race premiered January 6, 2023. The reality competition series moved to MTV for broadcast, instead of VH1 in the United States.

This season features the largest cast in the show's history, with sixteen queens competing and the largest cash prize, with the winner earning $200,000. It is also the first season to feature biological relatives, twins Sugar and Spice. Series judges Michelle Visage, Carson Kressley, and Ross Mathews returned, and Ts Madison, who had previously appeared as a recurring guest judge, joined the judges panel.

Production 
In November 2021, RuPaul announced a casting call for the fifteenth season of RuPaul's Drag Race on social media. The casting call was open until January 7, 2022, the day season fourteenth premiered. In August 2022, VH1 officially announced the show's renewal, as well for its companion series, RuPaul's Drag Race: Untucked. This season also included the milestone for its 200th episode of the series.

In December 2022, it was announced that season 15 would begin with a special two-part premiere on January 6, 2023, on MTV instead of VH1. Later that month, season 14 winner Willow Pill revealed the season's cast, with a record-breaking sixteen queens competing. The drag racing themed promotional images accompanying the cast announcement drew comparisons to the promotion for the show's debut season.

At the start of season 15, episodes were sixty minutes long, including commercials. This was a reversion to the previous format for seasons one through nine, after the show expanded to ninety minutes in season 10. Further, instead of airing Untucked immediately after each main episode, MTV aired the new reality program The Real Friends of WeHo between the main episode and Untucked. The shortened format and programming lineup change elicited backlash from the show's fan base. On February 9 it was announced that, beginning with the March 10 episode, episodes for the remainder of the season would be returning to the ninety minute format.

Contestants 

Ages, names, and cities stated are at time of filming.

Notes:

Contestant progress

Lip syncs
Legend:

Guest judges 
 Ariana Grande, singer and actress
 Maren Morris, singer-songwriter
 Amandla Stenberg, actress
 Janelle Monáe, singer, rapper, and actress
 Megan Stalter, comedian
 Harvey Guillén, actor
 Julia Garner, actress
 Ali Wong, stand-up comedian and actress
 Orville Peck, South African-Canadian country musician
 Hayley Kiyoko, singer, dancer, and actress

Special guests
Guests who appeared in episodes, but did not judge on the main stage.

Episode 1: 
 Albert Sanchez, photographer
 Vivacious, contestant on RuPaul's Drag Race season 6

Episode 6:
 Freddy Scott, composer and actor
 Leland, producer
 Old Gays, social media personalities and activists

Episode 7:
 Danny Trejo, actor

Episode 10:
 Charo, singer, actress, musician and comedian
 Frankie Grande, actor, singer, dancer, TV & Internet personality
 Love Connie, drag performer

Episodes

Ratings

References 

2023 American television seasons
2023 in LGBT history
RuPaul's Drag Race seasons